The Rock Show was a musical theatrical production that toured Australia between 2009 and 2012. Created by Stuart Smith, the production starred Smith, Jon English, Isaac Hayward, Paul Toole, Amy Vee, Andrew Sampford, Joe Kalou, Shaun Tarring, Kita Kerford, Natalya Bing, and Jonathan Sora-English. The production was a tribute to rock music from 1965 to 1980 and contained tracks originally recorded by AC/DC, Bob Dylan, The Who, The Beatles, The Rolling Stones and David Bowie among many other artists from the time period.
English said, "I'm amazingly proud to be a part of this show. People come along to see me, not really knowing what to expect, but invariably leave saying they are just blown away by the world-class young talent on stage."

The show was released on DVD in May and on CD/digital download in July 2012.

At the ARIA Music Awards of 2012, the album  was nominated for ARIA Award for Best Original Soundtrack, Cast or Show Album but lost to Straight to You – Triple J's Tribute to Nick Cave.

The production was followed by a series of similar shows including The Rock Show More, Rock Revolution and Trilogy of Rock. A fifth version, The Rock Show - Oz Edition, focusing solely on Australian music from the same time period, was to have toured in late 2016 but was canceled after English died in March of that year.

Track listing
Compact Disc/ Digital Download
CD 1
 "Hey Hey, My My (Out of the Blue)"/"The Times They Are a-Changin’" - 4:17
 "Let There Be Rock" - 3:32
 "My Generation" - 4:06
 "Two World Wars"/"Gloria" - 3:55
 "San Francisco (Be Sure to Wear Flowers in Your Hair)"/"The Sound of Silence"/ "California Dreaming" - 4:30
 "Mercedes Benz"/"Me and Bobby McGee" - 3:11
 "Purple Haze"/"Somebody to Love"/"White Room" - 4:40
 "A Whiter Shade of Pale" - 2:14
 "Handbags and Gladrags" - 4:48
 "Space Oddity"/"Rocket Man" - 5:12
 "Beatles Medley"   "Can’t Buy Me Love"/"Love Me Do"/"Help!"/"We Can Work It Out"/"Yesterday"/"Blackbird"/"Eleanor Rigby"/"I Am the Walrus"/"Octopus's Garden"/"Lady Madonna"/"Come Together"/"Hey Jude"  -13:08

CD 2
 "Won't Get Fooled Again"/"Kashmir" - 5:12
 "Stairway to Heaven" - 5:38
 "Guitar Riff Medley" "Smoke on the Water"/"Peter Gunn Theme"/"Day Tripper"/"Oh, Pretty Woman"/"Beat It"/"All Right Now"/"April Sun in Cuba"/"Eagle Rock"/"I Was Made for Lovin' You"/"You Shook Me All Night Long"/"You Really Got Me"/"Sunshine of Your Love"/"Smoke on the Water" - 4:55
 "Lola" - 5:18
 "See Me, Feel Me/"Pinball Wizard" - 2:33
 "You Took the Words Right Out of My Mouth" - 2:38
 "Wish You Were Here"/"Shine On You Crazy Diamond" - 5:45
 "Rolling Stones Medley"  "Honky Tonk Woman"/"Ruby Tuesday"/"Paint it Black"/"Get Off of My Cloud"/"(I Can't Get No) Satisfaction"/"Jumping Jack Flash"/"Brown Sugar"/"You Can't Always Get What You Want" - 15:20
 "Six Ribbons"/"Turn The Page"/"Hollywood Seven" - 8:50
 "Bohemian Rhapsody" - 5:31
 "With a Little Help From My Friends'/"Superstar" - 7:17

Show reviews

 “Light years away from the usual tired tribute show…. brilliantly conceived and executed” City News Canberra
 “Jon English and The Rock Show has definitely been one of the best live performances I have seen.” Fifty Plus Lifestyle Magazine
 “I haven’t seen so much hair, raw energy and young talent since the original performance of HAIR!  Jon English is the lynch pin, still charming and dashing and energetic…. The audience adored it.” Radio 3MDR Melbourne
 “The troupe mixed theatre and rock exquisitely … they were having fun and it showed.” The Examiner Launceston
 “A fantastic night of musical memories performed by some of the most talented people this country has to offer.” Easymix Ten-71, Bendigo
 “This is not a tribute show. THIS is a rock show.” Australian Stage Online
 “It is Jon English who elevates the show from a club cover band to an experience, with his unique and masterful stagecraft.” CX Magazine
 “Fantastic value for money musically, and a lot of fun, with the rock history stories and the banter between the ‘old man’ and his young crew keeping the crowd laughing as well as rocking on”. Newcastle Herald
 “English’s brilliant group of vibrant and versatile young musicians … They sing; they switch instruments, they cavort across the stage.  Quite simply, they rock.” Canberra Times

Release history

References

2012 live albums
Jon English albums
Live albums by Australian artists
Original musicals